Hinds Lake is a lake in Hubbard County, in the U.S. state of Minnesota.

Hinds Lake was named for Edward R. Hinds, a Minnesota state legislator.

See also
List of lakes in Minnesota

References

Lakes of Minnesota
Lakes of Hubbard County, Minnesota